Sehwa Girls' High School is a private girls high school located in Seocho-gu, Seoul, South Korea.

History
Sehwa Girls' High School was established on March 1, 1978. The current principal Won Yoo-shin was appointed on March 1, 2014 as the school's 11th principal.

Principals
List of principals of Sehwa Girls' High School
 1st: Song Hak-joon (1978.03.01—1980.10.25)
 2nd: Moon Young-gak (1980.10.25—1984.03.01)
 3rd: Hong Seong-joon (1984.03.01—1985.03.01)
 4th: Moon Young-gak (1985.03.01—1989.03.01)
 5th: Baek Soo-dong (1989.03.01—1993.03.01)
 6th: Jeong Jin-ui (1993.03.01—1997.03.01)
 7th: Oh Gi-soon (1997.03.01—2004.09.01)
 8th: Chae Nam-joo (2004.09.01—2008.03.01)
 9th: Park Jeong-shin (2008.03.01—2012.03.01)
 10th: Jeon Seon-gil (2012.03.01—2014.03.01)
 11th: Won Yoo-shin (2014.03.01—2020.03.01)
 12th: Kim Gi-hyuk (2020.03.01—Present)

Notable alumni

Entertainment
 Kang Min-kyung - Singer and member of Davichi
 Gummy - Singer
 Kim Wan-sun - Singer
 Lee Hyun-ji - Singer
 Euaerin - Singer and member of Nine Muses
 Jin Se-yeon - Actress
 Lee Mi-yeon - Actress
 Park Ro-sa - Actress
 Yoo Na-mi - Actress
 Choi Moon-gyeong - Movie actress
 Sohn Mina - Announcer and writer
 Kim Yoo-yeon - Singer and member of tripleS

Sports
 Cho Ha-ri - Short track speed skater
 Chella Choi - Professional golfer
 Choi Eun-kyung - Short track speed skater
 Choi Min-kyung - Short track speed skater
 Choi Ji-eun - Figure skater
 Hwang Min-kyoung - Volleyball player
 Joo Min-jin - Short track speed skater
 Ko Gi-hyun - Short track speed skater
 Lee Hae-in - Figure skater
 Lee Young-joo - Volleyball player
 Shim Suk-hee - Short track speed skater
 Son Soo-min - Short track speed skater

Politician
 Cho Yoon-sun

References

External links
 

Education in South Korea
Educational organizations based in South Korea
Education in Seoul
High schools in South Korea
Girls' schools in South Korea